Elena Vsevolodovna Neklyudova  — born Elena Soleynikova in Pskov in the west of Russia is a singer-songwriter. Her repertoire ranges from alternative rock to smooth jazz. Some of her charting hits are 'Убегаю" , "Жизнь"  and "Любить'" .

Biography 

Elena was born in a family of teachers of agricultural technical college. The father of the future singer was keen on music; he played on wind instruments in a college jazz band. He died when the girl was only 3 years old. Their life was tough those times. The mother had to raise three children without father with a regular wage of 120 rubles. Elena is from twins, she has a sister Larissa and a brother Oleg, who is 10 years older.

The passion for music revealed in Elena in the deep childhood. From the age of five she was confident about her future profession. Having an absolute ear for music, she studies in a music school. Sol-fa has never been a problem; it was her favorite subject, dismissing all the difficulties. So she was learning to play the piano and to sing, performed in a school choir. And at the age of 13 in cooperation with her sister Larissa she creates her first song. This was the time when music became not just a dream of childhood, but an inveterate intention.

Elena enters the music college for Faculty of Conducting and Choral right after eighth grade. Five years of studying in the college are left in her memory as one of the most joyful periods of life. Penetrating deeper into creative atmosphere, she keeps writing new works, including pieces for choir.

Discography 

 Повозка ( Wagon 2001)
 Шалунья-осень (Minx-autumn 2002)
 Жизнь (The Life 2005)
 Пять поколений (Five generations 2008)
 Непутёвая я (Ne'er-I 2009)
 Стрелы (Arrows 2010)
 Ты услышишь! (You'll hear! 2012)

References

Living people
Russian singer-songwriters
Russian women singer-songwriters
Soviet women singer-songwriters
Soviet singer-songwriters
Year of birth missing (living people)
20th-century Russian women singers
20th-century Russian singers